James Ostrer (born 1979) is a British photographer living in London.

Early life and family 

James Ostrer is a British photographer.

Notable works 

Curator's Choice: James Ostrer's portrait of Nicky Haslam at the National Portrait Gallery, London.

Co-founder of The Bombay Beach Biennale an annual art festival held in Bombay Beach, California.

References

Living people
1979 births